The 2019 UCI Mountain Bike World Championships was held in Mont-Sainte-Anne, Canada, from August 28 to September 1, 2019. This was the 30th edition of the most prestigious mountain bike event on the calendar, held annually since 1990, and the senior and under-23 cross-country races also functioned as a qualifier for the cross-country race at the 2020 Summer Olympics.

Medal summary

Men's events

Women's events

Team events

Olympic qualification

The following National Olympic Committees earned a quota place in the cross-country event in the 2020 Summer Olympics by virtue of high finish in either the elite senior or under 23 events.

References

UCI Mountain Bike World Championships
UCI Mountain Bike World Championships
Mountain Bike  Championships
Sport in Quebec
Cycling in Canada
UCI Mountain Bike World Championships
UCI Mountain Bike World Championships